Theodoros Iosifidis (born 17 January 1997) is a Cypriot footballer who plays as a centre-forward for Aris Limassol in the Cypriot First Division.

References

External links

1997 births
Living people
Cypriot footballers
Cypriot First Division players
Aris Limassol FC players
Association football forwards